Matawa First Nations (Ojibwe: ᒫᑕᐙ (maadawaa, "to fork, to confluence"); unpointed: ᒪᑕᐧᐊ), officially as the Matawa First Nations Management, Inc., is a non-profit Regional Chiefs' Council representing Ojibway and Cree First Nations in Northern Ontario, Canada.  The Council provides advisory services and program delivery to its ten member-Nations.

Mission

According to their own website, the Matawa First Nations state their mission is "... to supporting each other and focusing our collective efforts on core strategic priorities. By working together as a regional community, we will use our combined knowledge and resources in order to champion the social and economic vitality of our First Nations and invest in community and people building."

Council

The Council is made up of a representing Chief from each of the ten member communities. The Chiefs provide political direction to the organization in its strategic planning, government relations and policy development.  To assist in these activities, the Council maintains a political and advocacy staff to support its efforts in helping their communities to prosper.  In turn, the Council is a member of Nishnawbe Aski Nation, a Tribal Political Organization representing majority of Treaty 5 and Treaty 9 First Nations in northern Ontario.

Services

 Advisory Services
 Communications
 Economic Development
 Education
 Financial Advisory Services
 Membership Services
 Technical Services
 Administration & Finance
 Health & Social Services
 Employment & Training
 MFNM Business

Member First Nations

 Aroland First Nation 
 Constance Lake First Nation 
 Eabametoong First Nation 
 Ginoogaming First Nation 
 Hornepayne First Nation 
 Long Lake 58 First Nation 
 Marten Falls First Nation 
 Neskantaga First Nation 
 Nibinamik First Nation 
 Webequie First Nation

Official address

Matawa First Nations
233 South Court Street
Thunder Bay, Ontario  P7B 2X9
website

External links
INAC profile

Nishnawbe Aski Nation